Adrián Javier Bone Sánchez (born 8 September 1988) is an Ecuadorian international footballer who plays for Técnico Universitario, as a goalkeeper.

Club career
Bone has played for LDU de Cuenca, Aucas, ESPOLI, Deportivo Quito and El Nacional. While with Deportivo Quito, Bone won the 2011 Campeonato Ecuatoriano.

International career
He made his senior international debut for Ecuador in 2011.

In June 2014, he was named in Ecuador's squad for the 2014 FIFA World Cup.

References

External links

1988 births
Living people
Sportspeople from Esmeraldas, Ecuador
Ecuadorian footballers
Ecuador international footballers
Association football goalkeepers
S.D. Aucas footballers
C.D. ESPOLI footballers
S.D. Quito footballers
C.D. El Nacional footballers
2014 FIFA World Cup players